Islam Askhabovich Alsultanov (born 18 August 2001) is a Russian football player who plays as a striker for FC Akhmat Grozny.

Club career
He made his debut in the Russian Premier League for FC Akhmat Grozny on 18 October 2020 in a game against FC Rostov.

Career statistics

References

External links
 
 

2001 births
People from Ingushetia
Living people
Russian footballers
Association football forwards
FC Akhmat Grozny players
Russian Premier League players